Pseudomonardia is a genus of midges in the family Cecidomyiidae. The 15 described species are found in Australasia. The genus was first described by Mathias Jaschhof in 2003.

Species
Pseudomonardia australis Jaschhof, 2003
Pseudomonardia communis Jaschhof, 2003
Pseudomonardia dawnae Jaschhof, 2010
Pseudomonardia dorani Jaschhof, 2010
Pseudomonardia elongata Jaschhof, 2003
Pseudomonardia glacialis Jaschhof, 2003
Pseudomonardia hutchesoni Jaschhof, 2003
Pseudomonardia invisitata Jaschhof, 2003
Pseudomonardia neurolygoides Jaschhof, 2003
Pseudomonardia niklasi Jaschhof, 2010
Pseudomonardia pallida Jaschhof, 2003
Pseudomonardia parva Jaschhof, 2003
Pseudomonardia parvolobata Jaschhof, 2003
Pseudomonardia tobiasi Jaschhof, 2010
Pseudomonardia vicini Jaschhof, 2003

References

Cecidomyiidae genera

Insects described in 2003
Taxa named by Mathias Jaschhof